The 1986 NBA Finals was the championship round of the National Basketball Association (NBA)'s 1985–86 season, and the culmination of the season's playoffs. It pitted the Eastern Conference champion Boston Celtics against the Western Conference champion Houston Rockets, in a rematch of the 1981 NBA Finals (though only Allen Leavell and Robert Reid remained from the Rockets' 1981 team). It was the second and last NBA Championship Series of the 1980s not to feature the Los Angeles Lakers, who were eliminated by the Rockets on both occasions.

The heavily favored Celtics defeated the Rockets four games to two to win their 16th NBA championship. The championship would be the Celtics' last until 2008. Larry Bird was named the Finals MVP.

On another note, this series marked the first time the "NBA Finals" branding was officially used, as they dropped the "NBA World Championship Series" branding which had been in use since the beginning of the league, though it had been unofficially called the "NBA Finals" for years.

Until the 2011 series, this was the last time the NBA Finals had started before June. Since game three, all NBA Finals games have been played in June. Starting with the following year, the NBA Finals would be held exclusively in the month of June. It was also the last NBA Finals series to schedule a game on a Monday until 1999 and also the last NBA Finals game to be played on Memorial Day. Until the 2018 series, it was the last to conclude before June 10.

CBS Sports used Dick Stockton and Tom Heinsohn as the play-by-play man and color commentator respectively. Meanwhile, Brent Musburger was the host and Pat O'Brien (the Rockets' sideline) and Lesley Visser (the Celtics' sideline) were the sideline reporters.

Background

Boston Celtics

The Celtics made the 1985 NBA Finals, but lost in six games to the Los Angeles Lakers. The series exposed some of Boston's weaknesses, such as the lack of bench scoring, which was exploited after Kevin McHale moved to the starting lineup with Cedric Maxwell bothered by knee injuries. In addition, Larry Bird played through an elbow injury, which severely affected his shooting. In the offseason, president Red Auerbach decided to tweak the roster, trading Maxwell to the Los Angeles Clippers for off-injured center Bill Walton. He also made a trade with the Indiana Pacers, acquiring Jerry Sichting for Quinn Buckner. These moves would pave the way for the Celtics' greatest season yet.

Entering the 1985–86 season, the Celtics surged to a league-best 67–15 record, powered by an NBA record 40 victories at home. Their incomparable home record alone (since tied by the San Antonio Spurs in the  regular season) put the Celtics in the conversation among the NBA's greatest teams in a single season.

In the playoffs, Boston needed just three games to defeat the Chicago Bulls in the first round, despite a playoff record 63 points by Michael Jordan in Game 2. When asked about Jordan's performance in Boston's 135-131 2OT victory, Boston's coach K. C. Jones said, "I don't have a word for today." In retrospect, this game is considered to be a classic clash of the NBA's greatest player, Jordan, and the NBA's (arguably) greatest team, Bird's '86 Celtics. In the second round, Boston eliminated the Atlanta Hawks in five games, with the clinching Game 5 a no-doubter as Boston outscored Atlanta 36–6 in the third quarter in route to a 132–99 victory. Then in the conference finals, Boston swept the Milwaukee Bucks in four games, a direct reversal of their second round meeting in the 1983 NBA Playoffs.

Houston Rockets

Long-time Rockets Calvin Murphy and Rudy Tomjanovich retired, while Mike Dunleavy, Sr., Bill Willoughby, Tom Henderson and Billy Paultz moved on to different teams. But the biggest move came during the 1982 offseason, when the Rockets traded Moses Malone to the  champions Philadelphia 76ers. The loss of Malone sent the Rockets to a league-worst 14–68 record in the 1982–83 season, after which the Rockets were awarded the top pick of the 1983 NBA draft and selected Ralph Sampson.

After a 29-win season in 1984, the Rockets were once again rewarded with the top pick in the 1984 NBA draft. They selected another center in Akeem Olajuwon, and paired alongside Sampson, they were dubbed as the "Twin Towers". Houston also added some valuable role players to complement the duo and holdovers Allen Leavell and Robert Reid, acquiring Rodney McCray, Lewis Lloyd, Craig Ehlo, Mitchell Wiggins and Jim Petersen.

Under third-year head coach Bill Fitch (the head coach of the 1980–81 Celtics championship team), the Rockets posted a 51–31 record and won the Midwest Division title. In the first round, they swept the Sacramento Kings, then eliminated the Denver Nuggets in six games during the second round. In the conference finals, they were matched up against the defending champion Los Angeles Lakers, and after losing Game 1, the Rockets stunned the Lakers by winning the final four games, highlighted by a series-clinching buzzer beater by Sampson in Game 5.

Road to the Finals

Regular season series
The Boston Celtics won both games in the regular season series:

The Finals
The Larry Bird–led Celtics defeated the Rockets again 4 games to 2 in the 1986 NBA Finals. The Celtics won the first two games at the Boston Garden, where they had gone 40–1 during the regular season. The Rockets had been almost as good at home during the regular season, and they defeated the Celtics 106–104 in game three. Game 4 was a tense battle at the Summit, which the Celtics won 106–103, with Bill Walton coming off the bench for a tired Robert Parish to score a crucial basket. The infamous fifth game featured the signature moment of the series, when 7'4" Ralph Sampson ignited a brawl with Jerry Sichting, a player  shorter than Sampson, leading to his ejection. While Jim Petersen led the Rockets to a decisive victory, Sampson's actions motivated the Celtics to end the series in six. Bird dismantled the young Rockets in game 6; the raucous Garden crowd booed every time Sampson touched the ball. The Celtics eliminated the Rockets 114–97 in a game that wasn't as close as the score would indicate.

With backup forward Scott Wedman sidelined due to a wrist injury, Bird got very little rest during the six-game series, logging 269 out of a possible 288 minutes of floor time. Bird was named the Finals' MVP for that year, averaging 24 points, 9.7 rebounds, 9.7 assists, and 2.7 steals per game for the series. It was the Celtics' 16th championship in 40 years and it was their last championship for 22 years.

Series summary

Game 1

The "Twin Towers" Ralph Sampson and Akeem Olajuwon were saddled with foul trouble for much of the game. Sampson got three quick fouls just 4:45 into the game and scored only two points; Olajuwon picked up five fouls despite scoring 33, 25 of which came in the first half. The backcourt tandem of Dennis Johnson and Danny Ainge provided the third quarter spurt for the Celtics, combining for 22 points, while Boston held Houston to just 17 points in an expected victory.

Game 2

The third quarter again proved decisive for the Celtics, outscoring the Rockets 34–19 in the quarter. Sampson and Olajuwon combined for 32 points in the first half, but only seven in the second. Larry Bird paced the Celtics with 31 points on 12-for-19 shooting, while Kevin McHale added 25 in another Boston rout. It was Boston's 40th consecutive victory at home, regular season and playoffs combined.

Game 3

The Rockets rallied from eight points down in the fourth quarter before escaping to a much-needed two-point win at home, despite another third quarter meltdown. Sampson and Olajuwon combined for 47 points and 30 rebounds, Robert Reid added 20, while reserve guard Mitchell Wiggins tipped in off an Olajuwon miss late in the fourth to put the Rockets ahead for good. The Celtics only managed one more shot in their final two possessions, a missed 5-footer by Robert Parish. Kevin McHale and Larry Bird both scored 28 points in the loss, but Bird was held to 3-for-12 shooting in the second half due to Reid's defense.

Game 4

Larry Bird's three-pointer with 2:26 remaining gave Boston the lead for good, while holding the Rockets to just one basket in the final four minutes, keyed by Kevin McHale forcing three turnovers on Houston's final three possessions. Robert Parish scored 22 while hauling 15 rebounds. Dennis Johnson also added 22, while Bird scored 21 and dished out 10 assists. Ralph Sampson led the Rockets with 25 points, while Akeem Olajuwon, Robert Reid and Rodney McCray added 21, 19 and 17 respectively. The Rockets suffered their first home loss of the 1986 playoffs.

Game 5

The game was highlighted by Ralph Sampson's ejection early in the second quarter. With 9:40 remaining in the second, Sampson threw punches at the Celtics' reserve guard Jerry Sichting, 16 inches shorter than Sampson, leading to his ejection while the benches were cleared. The Rockets were leading 34–33 at the time of the brawl, and would lead by as many as 25 points in the second half to score a lopsided victory. Akeem Olajuwon scored 32 points while blocking 8 shots. Though Kevin McHale scored 33, Larry Bird was held to only 17 points, ultimately leading to one of the worst losses suffered by the Celtics that season.

As of 2022, this remains the last NBA Finals game to be played by the Celtics in a state other than Massachusetts or California.

Game 6

Larry Bird recorded a triple-double of 29 points, 11 rebounds and 12 assists to pace a lopsided Boston win that clinched their 16th NBA championship. Kevin McHale added 29 points, 10 rebounds and four blocks. Olajuwon paced the Rockets with 21 points and 10 rebounds, but Ralph Sampson was held to only eight points on 4-for-12 shooting, visibly distracted by an angry Boston Garden crowd in the aftermath of Game 5. The Celtics led by as much as 30 in the fourth to put away the Rockets.

Following the conclusion of the 1986 NBA Finals, a video documentary of the 1985–86 NBA season, known as "Sweet Sixteen", was released. David Perry was the narrator after Dick Stockton narrated the last three NBA season documentaries.

This would be the city of Boston's last professional sports championship until 2002 when the New England Patriots won Super Bowl XXXVI. Had the 1985 Patriots and the 1986 Boston Red Sox won Super Bowl XX and the 1986 World Series, respectively (the Patriots lost 46–10 to the Chicago Bears, while the Red Sox lost in seven games to the New York Mets), it would have given Boston three different professional sports championships in the same calendar year. In 2007–08, the city came very close to achieving this, as the 2007 Red Sox and 2007–08 Celtics won titles, but the 2007 Patriots lost Super Bowl XLII to the New York Giants. A Houston–Boston World Series was also a possibility; however, the Mets defeated the Houston Astros in six games of the 1986 National League Championship Series. In 2018–19, the 2018 Red Sox won the 2018 World Series, while the 2018 Patriots won Super Bowl LIII, giving Boston two different professional sports championships within a year, while the 2018–19 Boston Bruins reached the 2019 Stanley Cup Finals, but lost to the St. Louis Blues in seven games.

The closing song following Game 6 was "Whatever We Imagine" by James Ingram.

Player statistics

Boston Celtics

|-
| align="left" |  || 6 || 6 || 35.5 || .556 || .500 || .824 || 3.5 || 5.5 || 2.5 || 0.2 || 14.5 
|-! style="background:#FDE910;"
| align="left" |  || 6 || 6 || 44.8 || .482 || .368 || .939 || 9.7 || 9.5 || 2.7 || 0.3 || 24.0 
|-
| align="left" |  || 3 || 0 || 2.7 || 1.000 || .000 || .000 || 0.0 || 1.0 || 0.0 || 0.0 || 2.0 
|-
| align="left" |  || 6 || 6 || 42.8 || .420 || .286 || .821 || 6.2 || 5.3 || 2.0 || 0.3 || 17.0 
|-
| align="left" |  || 6 || 0 || 5.0 || 1.000 || .000 || 1.000 || 1.0 || 0.3 || 0.2 || 0.2 || 1.0 
|-
| align="left" |  || 6 || 6 || 40.2 || .573 || .000 || .804 || 8.5 || 1.7 || 0.8 || 2.5 || 25.8 
|-
| align="left" |  || 6 || 6 || 31.8 || .418 || .000 || .500 || 6.8 || 1.0 || 0.5 || 2.2 || 12.7 
|-
| align="left" |  || 6 || 0 || 14.2 || .450 || .000 || .000 || 0.8 || 1.7 || 0.0 || 0.0 || 3.0 
|-
| align="left" |  || 5 || 0 || 3.0 || .200 || .000 || .500 || 0.4 || 0.2 || 0.4 || 0.0 || 0.6 
|-
| align="left" |  || 4 || 0 || 3.0 || .182 || .000 || .000 || 0.8 || 0.0 || 0.5 || 0.0 || 1.0 
|-
| align="left" |  || 6 || 0 || 19.5 || .622 || .000 || .500 || 6.7 || 1.7 || 0.5 || 0.7 || 8.0 
|-
| align="left" |  || 1 || 0 || 2.0 || .000 || .000 || .000 || 0.0 || 0.0 || 0.0 || 0.0 || 0.0 

Houston Rockets

|-
| align="left" |  || 4 || 0 || 2.5 || .714 || .000 || .667 || 0.5 || 0.3 || 0.5 || 0.3 || 3.0 
|-
| align="left" |  || 4 || 0 || 6.8 || .417 || .000 || .400 || 1.0 || 0.0 || 0.3 || 0.8 || 3.0 
|-
| align="left" |  || 6 || 0 || 12.0 || .382 || .500 || .800 || 0.8 || 3.0 || 0.7 || 0.0 || 5.7 
|-
| align="left" |  || 6 || 6 || 22.3 || .380 || .000 || .800 || 1.8 || 2.8 || 0.5 || 0.2 || 7.7 
|-
| align="left" |  || 6 || 6 || 39.5 || .588 || .000 || .706 || 4.0 || 4.0 || 1.2 || 0.8 || 15.3 
|-
| align="left" |  || 5 || 0 || 1.8 || .667 || .000 || .667 || 1.0 || 0.6 || 0.0 || 0.0 || 1.6 
|-
| align="left" |  || 6 || 6 || 40.2 || .479 || .000 || .667 || 11.8 || 1.8 || 2.3 || 3.2 || 24.7 
|-
| align="left" |  || 6 || 0 || 22.7 || .311 || .000 || .750 || 7.2 || 1.8 || 0.7 || 0.5 || 5.2 
|-
| align="left" |  || 6 || 6 || 40.2 || .420 || .125 || .917 || 4.3 || 8.7 || 1.3 || 0.0 || 14.3 
|-
| align="left" |  || 6 || 6 || 32.2 || .438 || .000 || .731 || 9.5 || 3.3 || 1.0 || 0.8 || 14.8 
|-
| align="left" |  || 4 || 0 || 1.8 || 1.000 || .000 || .000 || 0.8 || 0.0 || 0.0 || 0.5 || 1.0 
|-
| align="left" |  || 6 || 0 || 22.2 || .451 || .000 || .667 || 3.7 || 1.3 || 0.8 || 0.2 || 8.3

Team rosters

Boston Celtics

Houston Rockets

See also
 1986 NBA Playoffs

References

External links
NBA History
1986 NBA Finals at Basketball Reference

National Basketball Association Finals
Finals
NBA
NBA
NBA Finals
NBA Finals
NBA Finals
NBA Finals
NBA Finals
Basketball competitions in Boston
Basketball competitions in Houston
NBA Finals
Boston Garden